Plug Me In is a DVD box set released on 16 October 2007 by Australian hard rock group AC/DC. It includes rare performances of the band. The standard two-disc set contains one disc of performances from the Bon Scott era and one from the Brian Johnson era. The three-disc set includes Between the Cracks, featuring performances from both eras. The performance of "Shoot to Thrill" from the Summit, Houston, TX, October 1983 is on both disc two and three.

In November 2008, Plug Me In won Classic Rock Roll of Honour Awards for DVD of the Year.

Track listing

Disc One: Bon Scott era
Live King of Pop Awards  Australia; 10 October 1975)
"High Voltage"
Live (Bandstand" Channel 9, Australia; 21 February 1976)
"It's a Long Way to the Top (If You Wanna Rock 'n' Roll)" 
Live St. Albans High March '76
"School Days" (St. Albans High School, Australia; 3 March 1976)
"T.N.T." (St. Albans High School, Australia; 3 March 1976)
Live at London July '76
"Live Wire" ("Super Pop / "Rollin' Bolan", London, England; 13 July 1976)
"Can I Sit Next to You Girl" ("Super Pop" / "Rollin' Bolan", London, England; 13 July 1976)
Live Sydney December '76
"Baby Please Don't Go" (Myer Music Bowl, Melbourne; 5 December 1976)
Live at the Hippodrome October'77
"Hell Ain't a Bad Place to Be" ("Sight & Sound, in Concert" (BBC2), Golders Green Hippodrome, London, England; 29 October 1977)
"Rocker" ("Sight & Sound, in Concert" (BBC2), Golders Green Hippodrome, London, England; 29 October 1977)
Live at the Apollo Theatre April'78
"Rock 'n' Roll Damnation" (Apollo Theatre, Glasgow; 30 April 1978)
"Dog Eat Dog" (Apollo Theatre, Glasgow; 30 April 1978)
"Let There Be Rock" (Apollo Theatre, Glasgow; 30 April 1978)
Live at Colchester October'78
"Problem Child" ("Rock Goes To College" (BBC2), Colchester, England; 28 October 1978)
"Sin City" ("Rock Goes To College" (BBC2), Colchester, England; 28 October 1978)
"Bad Boy Boogie" ("Rock Goes To College" (BBC2), Colchester, England; 28 October 1978)
Live at Countdown July '79
"Highway to Hell" ("Countdown" (ABC), Arnhem, the Netherlands; 13 July 1979)
"The Jack" ("Countdown" (ABC), Arnhem, the Netherlands; 13 July 1979)
"Whole Lotta Rosie" ("Countdown" (ABC), Arnhem, the Netherlands; 13 July 1979)

Bonus Features
Band Interview at Sydney Airport - "Countdown" (ABC); 1 April 1976
Band Interview - Covent Garden, London, England; 16 July 1976
"Baby Please Don't Go" - Circus Krone, Munich, Germany; 29 September 1976
"Problem Child" - Sidney Myer Music Bowl, Melbourne; 5 December 1976
Radio 3XY Promo: "Dirty Deeds Done Dirt Cheap" - Melbourne, Australia; December 1976
Bon Scott Interview - Countdown (ABC), London, England; 1 November 1977
"Rock 'n' Roll Damnation" - Top of the Pops (BBC1), London, England; 8 June 1978
Band Interview & Concert Highlights - "Australian Music to the World", Atlanta, Georgia, USA; 11 August 1978
Super 8 Bootleg Film of Concert Clips - Théatre de Verdure, Nice, France; 14 December 1979

Disc Two: Brian Johnson era
"Shot Down in Flames" (Nippon Budokan, Tokyo; 5 February 1981)
"What Do You Do for Money Honey" (Nippon Budokan, Tokyo; 5 February 1981)
"You Shook Me All Night Long" (Nippon Budokan, Tokyo; 5 February 1981)
"Let There Be Rock" (Nippon Budokan, Tokyo; 5 February 1981)
"Back in Black" (Capital Center, Landover, Maryland; 20 December 1981)
"T.N.T." (Capital Center, Landover, Maryland; 20 December 1981)
"Shoot to Thrill" (The Summit, Houston, TX; 30 October 1983)
"Guns for Hire" (Joe Louis Arena, Detroit, Michigan; 17 November 1983)
"Dirty Deeds Done Dirt Cheap" (Joe Louis Arena, Detroit, Michigan; 17 November 1983)
"Flick of the Switch" (Capital Center, Landover, Maryland; 12 December 1983)
"Bedlam in Belgium" (Capital Center, Landover, Maryland; 12 December 1983)
Montage: Coup Victims Memorial Service "Hells Bells" / "Back in Black" (Tushino Airfield, Moscow; 28 September 1991)
"Highway to Hell" (Tushino Airfield, Moscow; 28 September 1991)
"Whole Lotta Rosie" (Tushino Airfield, Моscow; 28 September 1991)
"For Those About to Rock (We Salute You)" (Tushino Airfield, Moscow; 28 September 1991)
"Gone Shootin'" (VH1 Studio B, London, England; 5 July 1996)
"Hail Caesar" (Entertainment Center, Sydney; 14 November 1996)
"Ballbreaker" (Entertainment Center, Sydney; 14 November 1996)
"Rock and Roll Ain't Noise Pollution" (Entertainment Center, Sydney; 14 November 1996)
"Hard as a Rock" (Stade de France, Paris; 22 June 2001)
"Hells Bells" (Stade de France, Paris; 22 June 2001)
"Ride On" (Stade de France, Paris; 22 June 2001)
"Stiff Upper Lip" (Circus Krone, München; 17 June 2003)
"Thunderstruck" (Circus Krone, München; 17 June 2003)
"If You Want Blood (You've Got It)" ("Toronto Rocks" Downsview Park, Toronto; 30 July 2003)
"The Jack" ("Toronto Rocks" Downsview Park, Toronto; 30 July 2003)
"You Shook Me All Night Long" ("Toronto Rocks" Downsview Park, Toronto; 30 July 2003)

Bonus features
"Ballbreaker Tour" intro film - "Beavis and Butt-Head"; 1996
Brian and Angus Interview & "Hells Bells" Live - Countdown (ABC), Forest National Brussels; 25 January 1981
Angus Young and David Lee Roth Interview - Whistle Test (BBC 2), Castle Donington Park; 18 August 1984
Rehearsal for "Gone Shootin'''" - VH1 Studio B, London, England; 5 July 1996
Angus and Malcolm Young with The Rolling Stones "Rock Me Baby" - Licks Tour, Festwiese, Leipzig, Germany; 20 June 2003

Disc Three: Between the Cracks
"She's Got Balls" (St. Albans High School, Australia, March 1976)
"It's a Long Way to the Top" (St. Albans High School, Australia, March 1976)
"Let There Be Rock" (Sight & Sound In Concert, London, October 1977)
"Bad Boy Boogie" (Apollo Theatre, Glasgow, April 1978)
"Girls Got Rhythm" (Top Pop, 1979)
"Guns for Hire" (Band rehearsals 1983)
"This House Is on Fire" (Joe Louis Arena, Detroit, MI, November 1983)
"Highway to Hell" (Point Theatre, Dublin, June 1996)
"Girls Got Rhythm" (Entertainment Center, Sydney, November 1996)
"Let There Be Rock" (Stuttgart 2000)
Angus Statue Intro (Stiff Upper Lip Tour Film 2001)

Live at the Summit in Houston, 1983
"Guns for Hire"
"Shoot to Thrill"
"Sin City"
"This House Is on Fire"
"Back in Black"
"Bad Boy Boogie"
"Rock and Roll Ain't Noise Pollution"
"Flick of the Switch"
"Hells Bells"

Memorabilia (Collector's Edition only)
AC/DC Live at Circus Krone Entry Reproduction
AC/DC 1981 For Those About to Rock Tour Guest Pass Reproduction
AC/DC Live at St. Albans High School Entry Reproduction
AC/DC 1981 Back in Black Tour Entry Reproduction
AC/DC 1983 Flick of the Switch Tour Working Personnel Pass Reproduction
AC/DC 1978 Powerage Tour at "The Apollo" Entry Reproduction
AC/DC Back in Black Tour "Back in London" Access All Areas Pass Reproduction
AC/DC Highway to Hell Tour Poster Reproduction

Bonus CD
Most music stores had a Plug Me In bonus CD with "Dog Eat Dog" from Glasgow in 1978 and "Back in Black" from Moscow in 1991.
Best Buy in the US had a limited edition Plug Me In bonus CD with three live songs and Wal-Mart in the US had an exclusive Plug Me In bonus CD with five live songs.

Track listing

Standard Bonus CD
"Dog Eat Dog" (Live, Apollo, Glasgow, 30 April 1978)
"Back in Black" (Live, Tushino Airfield, Moscow, 28 September 1991)

Best Buy Bonus CD
"Rock 'n' Roll Damnation" (Live, Apollo, Glasgow, 30 April 1978)
"Dirty Deeds Done Dirt Cheap" (Live, Joe Louis Arena, Detroit, 18 November 1983)
"Thunderstruck" (Live, Circus Krone, Munich, 17 June 2003)

Wal-Mart Bonus CD
"Problem Child" (Live, Melbourne, 5 December 1976)
"Let There Be Rock" (Live, Apollo, Glasgow, 30 April 1978)
"Guns for Hire" (Live, Joe Louis Arena, Detroit, 18 November 1983)
"For Those About to Rock (We Salute You)" [Live, Tushino Airfield, Moscow, 28 September 1991)
"Stiff Upper Lip" (Live, Circus Krone, Munich, 17 June 2003)

Charts

Certifications

NotesPlug Me In 5.1 was mixed by Mike Fraser.Plug Me In'' reached #1 on the ARIA DVD Chart, and has achieved 5× platinum status in Australia.

References

AC/DC video albums
AC/DC live albums
2007 video albums
Live video albums
2007 live albums